Ariovaldo Guilherme (born 2 August 1969), commonly known as Ari Bozão, is a former Brazilian footballer.

Career statistics

Club

Notes

References

1969 births
Living people
Brazilian footballers
Brazilian expatriate footballers
Brazil youth international footballers
Association football defenders
Sport Club Corinthians Paulista players
Amora F.C. players
S.C. Covilhã players
Aurora F.C. players
Cobán Imperial players
Brazilian expatriate sportspeople in Portugal
Expatriate footballers in Portugal
Brazilian expatriate sportspeople in Guatemala
Expatriate footballers in Guatemala
Footballers from São Paulo (state)
People from Jaú